Cassandra Jenkins is an American musician, singer and songwriter based in Brooklyn, New York, United States.

Early life and education
Cassandra Jenkins was born into a musical New York family. Her parents played on cruise ships in the 1980s. She learned how to play guitar and sing at a young age. Before the age of 12, she toured with her family band playing folk music at festivals.

Jenkins graduated from the Rhode Island School of Design in 2006, where she studied visual arts. For two years, she worked as an editorial assistant at The New Yorker.

Career 
Jenkins released her self-titled debut EP in April 2013, with an album titled Play Till You Win following in 2017 and receiving positive reviews. Her second album, An Overview on Phenomenal Nature, was released to critical acclaim in February 2021, featuring production by multi-instrumentalist Josh Kaufman.

Jenkins performed as a back-up member for Eleanor Friedberger and Craig Finn, and was scheduled to tour with Purple Mountains before the death of David Berman in 2019.

In 2022, Jenkins accompanied Courtney Barnett on several of her tour dates across the U.S.

Also in 2022 Jenkins opened for Mitski on portions of her United Kingdom tour, including in Cardiff.

Discography

Studio Albums 
 Play Till You Win (2017)
 An Overview on Phenomenal Nature (2021)

Extended plays 
EP (2013)

Compilations 
 (An Overview on) An Overview on Phenomenal Nature (2021)

Live albums 
Cassandra Jenkins on Audiotree Live (2018)
Live in Foxen Canyon (2018)

Singles 
 "Rabbit" (2013)
 "Perfect Day" (2014)
 "Hotel Lullaby" (Acoustic) (2019)
 "Things To You" (2020)
 "Michelangelo" (2021)
 "Hard Drive" (2021)

References

External links
 

1980s births
Living people
American indie rock musicians
Singers from New York (state)
Songwriters from New York (state)
Folk musicians from New York (state)
Musicians from New York City
Rhode Island School of Design alumni
The New Yorker people
Rhode Island School of Design alumni in music